Sankarabharanam is a 2015 Indian Telugu-language crime comedy film directed by Uday Nandanavanam and written by Kona Venkat. It stars Nikhil Siddharth and Nanditha Raj in lead roles. It is produced by MVV Sathyanarayana under the Banner MVV Cinema. The music is composed by Praveen Lakkaraju and cinematography is by Sai Sriram and the film editing by Chota K. Prasad. The film was a remake of 2010 Hindi film Phas Gaye Re Obama.

Plot
An NRI(Gautham), who is on the verge of bankruptcy, learns that he owns a palace in India and sets out to sell it. However, his visit to India turns into an insane journey when he gets kidnapped.

Cast

 Nikhil Siddharth as Gautham
 Nanditha Raj as Happy Thakur
 Anjali as Daaku Rani Munni in a cameo appearance 
 Sampath Raj as Central Minister Lal / Krishna (Dual Role)
 Suman as Raghu, Gautham's Father
 Sithara as Rajjo Devi, Gautham's Mother
 Rao Ramesh as Badrinath Thakur, Happy's Father
 Sanjay Mishra as Bhai Saab
 Saptagiri as Akshay Kumar
 Prudhvi Raj as Percentage Paramesh S.I 
 Satyam Rajesh as Lakshman Yadav
 Viva Harsha as Happy's cousin
 Praveen
 Diksha Panth
 Geetha Singh
 Ankitha Sharma
 Shakalaka Shankar

Production
Filming began in early June 2015 on locations in Maharashtra before moving to Bihar and before then shifting to Hyderabad, and in late June, production was reported as going very well.
Filming wrapped on 15 October 2015.

Soundtrack

The soundtrack has been composed by Praveen Lakkaraju. Mango Music launched the audio tracks of the movie.

References

External links
 

2010s crime comedy films
Indian crime comedy films
Indian black comedy films
Telugu remakes of Hindi films
2010s Telugu-language films
Indian comedy road movies
2015 comedy films